Nototodarus hawaiiensis, the Hawaiian flying squid, is a species of squid. 
It mainly lives at depths of about 400 - 570 m. It lives in the Pacific Ocean from Hawaiian Islands to Midway Island. It is listed as a Least Concern species by the IUCN red list.

References

hawaiiensis